Alexander M. Quinn (1866 – May 4, 1906) was a soldier in the United States Army who received the Medal of Honor for his actions in the Spanish–American War.

Quinn joined the army from Philadelphia, Pennsylvania in May 1889, but was discharged after only a few months of service. He rejoined the army in June 1891, and Philippine–American War. He was mortally wounded while serving in the Philippines, and died on May 4th, 1906.

Medal of Honor citation
Sergeant Quinn's citation reads:
Gallantly assisted in the rescue of the wounded from in front of the lines and under heavy fire from the enemy.

See also

 List of Medal of Honor recipients for the Spanish–American War

References

External links
 
 

1866 births
1906 deaths
United States Army Medal of Honor recipients
American military personnel of the Spanish–American War
Spanish–American War recipients of the Medal of Honor
Burials at Holy Sepulchre Cemetery (Totowa, New Jersey)